Cephalodynerus is a nearctic genus of potter wasps with six species.

References

Potter wasps